Blackbaud (NASDAQ:BLKB) is a cloud computing provider that serves the social good community—nonprofits, foundations, corporations, education institutions, healthcare organizations, religious organizations, and individual change agents. Its products focus on fundraising, website management, CRM, analytics, financial management, ticketing, and education administration.

Blackbaud's flagship product is a fundraising SQL database software, Raiser's Edge. Revenue from the sale of Raiser's Edge and related services accounted for thirty percent of Blackbaud's total revenue in 2012. Other products and services include Blackbaud Enterprise CRM, Altru, Financial Edge, Education Edge, Blackbaud NetCommunity, Luminate Online, Luminate CRM, Friends Asking Friends. In addition, Blackbaud offers consultancy services to nonprofit organizations.

Blackbaud was founded in 1981 by Anthony Bakker. The company is headquartered in Charleston, South Carolina. It has regional offices in Austin, Texas; Plano, Texas; St. Paul, Minnesota; and Bedford, New Hampshire. Internationally, Blackbaud has offices in London, England; Sydney, Australia and Glasgow, Scotland.

Michael Gianoni is Blackbaud's CEO.

History
Blackbaud's history traces back to 1981, when Blackbaud founder Anthony Bakker developed a computerized billing system for the Nightingale-Bamford School in Manhattan, New York City. By 1982, Bakker's expanded client list allowed him to quit his day job as a banker, and he incorporated Blackbaud Microsystems. Bakker's new company was headquartered in New York City. Blackbaud's first product was Student Billing, an accounts receivable system geared toward private grade schools. The company's flagship product, The Raiser's Edge, was developed from its Student Billing product.

The company had 75 employees in 1989, when it decided to relocate from New York City due to high operational costs. Blackbaud relocated to Mount Pleasant, South Carolina, with the help of a $750,000 business loan. Of the company's original 75 employees, 30 remained in a support and training office in New York City and 15 relocated to Blackbaud's new South Carolina headquarters. In 1992, the company outgrew its Mount Pleasant headquarters and relocated to North Charleston, South Carolina.

In 1994, Blackbaud converted its software offerings from DOS to Windows 95. This decision led to a sales increase from $19 million in 1995 to $26 million in 1996. During this time Blackbaud acquired multiple DOS-based competitors, including ACOMS of Burlington, Massachusetts; Master Systems Inc. of Pinole, California; and Blackbaud's "chief challenger", Master Software of Indianapolis, Indiana. Blackbaud's acquisition of Master Software doubled its customer base.

Blackbaud began using value-added resellers in 1998, which further expanded the company's customer base. In 2000, Robert Sywolski became CEO of Blackbaud. Sywolski had previously served as CEO of North American operations for Cap Gemini, an international consulting firm.

Blackbaud successfully completed its initial public offering in 2004. Sixteen months later, in November 2005, Marc Chardon replaced Sywolski as Blackbaud CEO. Chardon had previously served as chief financial officer of Microsoft's information worker group, which developed Microsoft Office among other products.

Blackbaud acquired Campagne Associates in 2006. The company added both Target Software and Target Analysis Group in 2007. Target Software developed large-scale database management solutions, while the Target Analysis Group focused primarily on data mining for nonprofits. Later that year, Blackbaud also acquired , an online donor management tool.

Blackbaud acquired Kintera in 2008. In 2012, the company acquired Convio.

In early 2013, Blackbaud announced that CEO Marc Chardon would leave the company by the end of that year. Anthony Boor became Blackbaud's interim CEO in August 2013. Boor joined Blackbaud as the company's chief financial officer in 2011. He was credited with leading Blackbaud's acquisition of Convio.

Michael Gianoni was named the new president and CEO for Blackbaud in November 2013.

Blackbaud acquired MicroEdge in 2014 for $160 million. MicroEdge was a software provider to foundations, with about 2,000 customers.

In October 2017, Blackbaud completed a £95m, about $127.4 million, purchase of JustGiving.

In April 2018, Blackbaud acquired Reeher, a St. Paul, Minnesota-based predictive modeling platform for colleges and universities, for $40 million.

In January 2019, Blackbaud acquired YourCause, a software as a service (SaaS) provider focused on increasing corporate giving and volunteering for nonprofits and causes.

Cyber attack 
In May 2020, Blackbaud fell victim to a cyber attack. Customer data was stolen, and Blackbaud paid the criminals a ransom in exchange for "credible confirmation" that the stolen data was deleted. Over 100 customers were affected, including at least twenty universities and charities based in the United Kingdom, the United States, the Netherlands and Canada. Blackbaud externally disclosed the incident in July 2020, weeks after, the company learned about the attack. Blackbaud received criticism for paying the hackers' ransom and its delay in disclosing the attack, as large data breaches must be reported to data authorities within 72 hours of learning about an incident under European General Data Protection Regulations. In a September 29, 2020 Form 8-K filing, Blackbaud CFO Tony Boor admitted, contrary to earlier claims, that customer "bank account information, social security numbers, usernames and/or passwords" were compromised.

In their quarterly filing to the U.S. Securities and Exchange Commission (SEC) in August 2020, the company failed to disclose that donor bank account information and Social Security numbers had been accessed by the attacker. In March 2023, the SEC fined Blackbaud $3 million for this omission.

Blackbaud faces class actions from clients in South Carolina and Massachusetts.

Criticism
Blackbaud were criticised in the wake of the Robb Elementary School shooting for its links with the National Rifle Association.

Products
Blackbaud creates software that helps nonprofits with Customer Relationship Management (CRM), marketing campaigns, fundraising, finance and accounting, and analytics. The company has three CRM offerings: The Raiser's Edge NXT, Blackbaud CRM and Luminate CRM. Blackbaud CRM is a web-based platform that is the company's lead offering for larger organizations that need to handle complex tasks. Luminate is Blackbaud's offering for mid-tier organizations and is fully integrated with Salesforce.com. Financial Edge NXT is Blackbaud's cloud based fund accounting system designed to integrate seamlessly with The Raiser's Edge NXT fundraising CRM, manage financial reporting/budgeting, monitor and track grant/program success, and support fundraising efforts. In 2022, Blackbaud added Prospect Insights with Raiser's Edge NXT for better fundraising tools in targeting specific donors.

Philanthropy
Blackbaud has an extensive corporate citizenship and philanthropy program. Volunteer for Vacation is an employee initiative, where the company gives paid vacation to employees who participate in volunteer community service. The company's Reward your Passion initiative allows employees to apply for company-funded grants that help a charity of their choice. In 2013, the company expanded its grant program to include locations beyond its Charleston, South Carolina headquarters. Later that year, Blackbaud launched Business Doing Good, a website that is focused on providing information for small and medium-sized businesses to create their own corporate philanthropy programs. The company also hosts volunteer fairs and other community service events throughout the year.

References

External links
 
 

2004 initial public offerings
Business software companies
Companies established in 1981
Companies listed on the Nasdaq
Customer relationship management software companies
Financial software companies
Software companies based in South Carolina
Software companies of the United States